Creatures 3 is the third game in the Creatures a-life game series made by Creature Labs. In this installment, the Shee have left Albia in a spaceship, the Shee Ark, to search for a more spherical world. The Ark was abandoned by the Shee because a meteor hit the ship, but the infrastructure still remains in working order.

There are 6 main "metarooms" on the ship; the Norn Terrarium, Grendel Jungle, Ettin Desert, Marine area, Bridge, and Engineering Room. The Norn Terrarium is where you can safely hatch and raise your norns. The Grendel Jungle is where the Grendel mother (egg-layer) is, and it is well suited for Grendels. The Ettin Desert is where the Ettin mother is; it is a dry, harsh environment for all creatures. The Bridge is where you will find the most gadgets, and also the most Ettins. The Engineering Room is where the Agent Creator is, with which you can create objects for your world.

Grendels are now vicious, unlike the original Creatures Grendels; these Grendels enjoy hunting down, and then killing norns. The Ettins, which first appeared in Creatures 2, love gathering gadgets and taking them back to the Ettin Desert.

Creatures 3 runs on the CAOS engine, making it highly moddable, but now it is retired and outdated.

In December 2021, Creatures 3 will be released on the Steam games service.

See also 
Creatures (artificial life program)
Bundles with Creatures 3
Docking Station (Creatures)

References

External links 
Creatures 3 on the Creatures wiki

Creatures 3 source code, circa January 2000 at the Internet Archive.
Eurogamer review
CNN review

Artificial life
Creatures (video game series)
Creature Labs games
Virtual pet video games
Biological simulation video games
God games
Linux games
MacOS games
Windows games
1999 video games
Video game sequels
Video games developed in the United Kingdom
Linux Game Publishing games
Mindscape games